Hexactinellid sponges are sponges with a skeleton made of four- and/or six-pointed siliceous spicules, often referred to as glass sponges. They are usually classified along with other sponges in the phylum Porifera, but some researchers consider them sufficiently distinct to deserve their own phylum, Symplasma. Some experts believe glass sponges are the longest-lived animals on earth; these scientists tentatively estimate a maximum age of up to 15,000 years.

Biology
Although the species Oopsacas minuta has been found in shallow water, others have been found much deeper. They are found in all oceans of the world, although they are particularly common in Antarctic and Northern Pacific waters.

The body is relatively symmetrical, with a large central cavity that, in many species, opens to the outside through a sieve formed from the skeleton. Some species of glass sponges are capable of fusing together to create reefs or bioherms. They are generally pale in colour, ranging from white to orange.

Much of the body is composed of syncitial tissue, extensive regions of multinucleate cytoplasm. The epidermal cells characteristic of other sponges are absent, being replaced by a syncitial net of amoebocytes, through which the spicules penetrate. Unlike other sponges, they do not possess the ability to contract.

Their body comprises three parts: the inner and outer peripheral trabecular networks, and the choanosome, which is used for feeding purposes. The choanosome acts as the mouth for the sponge while the inner and outer canals that meet at the choanosome are passages for the food, creating a consumption path for the sponge. 

All hexactinellids have the potential to grow to different sizes, but the average maximum growth is estimated to be around 32 centimeters long. Some grow past that length and continue to extend their length up to 1 meter long. The estimated life expectancy for hexactinellids that grow around 1 meter is approximately 200 years (Plyes).

Glass sponges possess a unique system for rapidly conducting electrical impulses across their bodies, making it possible for them to respond quickly to external stimuli. Species like "Venus' flower basket" have a tuft of fibers that extends outward like an inverted crown at the base of their skeleton.

Glass sponges are different from other sponges in various other ways. For example, most of the cytoplasm is not divided into separate cells by walls but forms a syncytium or continuous mass of cytoplasm with many nuclei (e.g., Reiswig and Mackie, 1983).

These creatures are long-lived, but the exact age is hard to measure; one study based on modelling gave an estimated age of a specimen of Scolymastra joubini as 23,000 years (with a range from 13,000 to 40,000 years). However, due to changes in sea levels since the Last Glacial Maximum, its maximum age is thought to be no more than 15,000 years, hence its listing of c. 15,000 years in the AnAge Database. The shallow-water occurrence of hexactinellids is rare worldwide. In the Antarctic, two species occur as shallow as 33 meters under the ice.

Reefs
The sponges form reefs (called sponge reefs) off the coast of British Columbia, southeast Alaska and Washington state, which are studied in the Sponge Reef Project. Reefs discovered in Hecate Strait, British Columbia, have grown to up to 7 kilometres long and 20 metres high. Prior to these discoveries, sponge reefs were thought to have died out in the Jurassic period.

Reports of glass sponges have also been recorded on the HCMS Saskatchewan and HCMS Cape Breton wrecks off the coast of Vancouver Island.

Classification
The earliest known hexactinellids are from the earliest Cambrian or late Neoproterozoic eras. They are fairly common relative to demosponges as fossils, but this is thought to be, at least in part, because their spicules are sturdier than spongin and fossilize better. Like almost all sponges, the hexactinellids draw water in through a series of small pores by the whip-like beating of a series of hairs or flagella in chambers which in this group line the sponge wall.

The class is divided into five orders, in two subclasses:

Class Hexactinellida
Subclass Amphidiscophora
Order Amphidiscosida
Subclass Hexasterophora
Incertae sedis
Dactylocalycidae Gray, 1867
Order Lychniscosida
Order Lyssacinosida
Order Sceptrulophora

See also
 Sponge reef
 Cloud sponge
 Sponge Reef Project

References

External links 
 
 

 
Extant Cambrian first appearances